

This is a list of the flora of Queensland listed as Endangered under the Nature Conservation Act 1992.

 Acacia porcata
 Acacia ramiflora
 Acacia rubricola
 Acacia saxicola
 Acacia sp. (Ruined Castle Creek P.I.Forster+ PIF17848)
 Acmena sp. (Cooper Creek P.I.Forster+ PIF15557)
 Acronychia littoralis
 Alectryon ramiflorus
 Alectryon repandodentatus
 Allocasuarina emuina
 Allocasuarina thalassoscopica
 Apatophyllum olsenii
 Aponogeton bullosus
 Aponogeton proliferus
 Archidendron kanisii
 Archontophoenix myolensis
 Aristida granitica
 Astrotricha roddii
 Atalaya collina
 Austromyrtus fragrantissima
 Austromyrtus gonoclada
 Babingtonia granitica
 Babingtonia papillosa
 Babingtonia silvestris
 Bertya sp. (Beeron Holding P.I.Forster+ PIF5753)
 Boea kinnearii
 Boronia granitica
 Boronia repanda
 Brachychiton sp. (Blackwell Range R.J.Fensham 971)
 Bulbophyllum blumei
 Cajanus mareebensis
 Caladenia atroclavia
 Calochilus psednus
 Capparis humistrata
 Carronia pedicellata
 Chingia australis
 Coix gasteenii
 Corchorus cunninghamii
 Cossinia australiana
 Costus potierae
 Crepidium lawleri
 Crepidomanes aphlebioides
 Cyathea exilis
 Cyathea felina
 Cycas megacarpa
 Cycas ophiolitica
 Cyperus cephalotes
 Davidsonia johnsonii
 Decaspermum sp. (Mt Morgan N.Hoy AQ455657)
 Dendrobium antennatum
 Dendrobium lithocola
 Dendrobium mirbelianum
 Dendrobium nindii
 Dinosperma longifolium
 Diplazium pallidum
 Diploglottis campbellii
 Dipodium pictum
 Endiandra cooperana
 Endiandra floydii
 Eremochloa muricata
 Eriocaulon carsonii
 Eryngium fontanum
 Eucalyptus conglomerata
 Eucalyptus pachycalyx subsp. waajensis
 Eucalyptus sp. (Brovinia A.R.Bean 11911)
 Eucryphia jinksii
 Euphrasia bella
 Fimbristylis adjuncta
 Fontainea fugax
 Gardenia actinocarpa
 Genoplesium tectum
 Graptophyllum reticulatum
 Grevillea linsmithii
 Habenaria harroldii
 Habenaria macraithii
 Hedyotis novoguineensis
 Hemigenia clotteniana
 Homopholis belsonii
 Huperzia carinata
 Huperzia dalhousieana
 Huperzia filiformis
 Huperzia squarrosa
 Jasminum jenniae
 Lasiopetalum sp. (Proston J.A.Baker 17)
 Leionema elatius subsp. beckleri
 Leucopogon sp. (Coolmunda D.Halford Q1635)
 Leucopogon recurvisepalus
 Lilaeopsis brisbanica
 Macadamia jansenii
 Macrozamia cranei
 Macrozamia lomandroides
 Macrozamia pauli-guilielmi
 Macrozamia platyrhachis
 Macrozamia sp. (Marlborough P.I.Forster+ PIF12269A)
 Macrozamia viridis
 Microcarpaea agonis
 Micromyrtus carinata
 Micromyrtus delicata
 Micromyrtus patula
 Muellerargia timorensis
 Mukia sp. (Longreach D.Davidson AQ279935)
 Myriophyllum sp. (Aramac B.A.Wilson 110)
 Nepenthes mirabilis
 Nesaea robertsii
 Nicotiana wuttkei
 Noahdendron nicholasii
 Ochrosia moorei
 Oldenlandia gibsonii
 Oldenlandia spathulata
 Olearia hygrophila
 Olearia sp. (Glenavon P.I.Forster+ PIF15039)
 Parsonsia sankowskyana
 Phaius australis
 Phaius bernaysii
 Phaius tancarvilleae
 Phalaenopsis rosenstromii
 Plesioneuron tuberculatum
 Pomaderris clivicola
 Pomaderris coomingalensis
 Pouteria eerwah
 Plectranthus nitidus
 Plectranthus omissus
 Plectranthus habrophyllus
 Plectranthus torrenticola
 Prostanthera sp. (Dinden P.I.Forster+ PIF17342)
 Pterostylis chaetophora
 Randia moorei
 Rhodamnia angustifolia
 Rutidosis lanata
 Sankowskya stipularis
 Sarcochilus fitzgeraldii
 Sarcochilus weinthalii
 Solanum adenophorum
 Solanum papaverifolium
 Sporobolus pamelae
 Stackhousia sp. (McIvor River J.R.Clarkson 5201)
 Tectaria devexa var. devexa
 Toechima pterocarpum
 Trioncinia retroflexa
 Triunia robusta
 Vincetoxicum forsteri, syn. Tylophora linearis
 Vincetoxicum rupicola, syn. Tylophora rupicola
 Vincetoxicum woollsii, syn. Tylophora woollsii
 Vrydagzynea paludosa
 Xanthostemon formosus
 Xerothamnella herbacea
 Zieria furfuracea subsp. (Belmont Scrub Unknown AQ152898)
 Zieria sp. (Binjour P.I.Forster PIF14134)
 Zieria sp. (Brolga Park A.R.Bean 1002)

References

 
.

Queensland Nature Conservation Act endangered
Queensland Nature Conservation Act flora
Endangered flora
Endangered flora